Simplocaria metallica is a species of pill beetle in the family Byrrhidae. It is found in Europe and Northern Asia (excluding China) and North America.

S. metallica is an obligate herbivore, often feeding from three main moss species: Pohlia filum, Ceratodon purpureus, and Bryum arcticum. Data suggests that this diet is shared between males and females, preferring the moss genera, Pohlia.

References

Further reading

External links

 

Byrrhidae
Articles created by Qbugbot
Beetles described in 1807